Norberto Hugo Scoponi (born 13 January 1961) is an Argentine former professional footballer who played as a goalkeeper. He was born in the city of Rosario in the Santa Fe Province of Argentina. He played the majority of his career for Newell's Old Boys of the Primera División Argentina where he won three Argentine league titles.

In 1995 Scoponi moved to Mexico to play for Cruz Azul, he returned to Argentina in 1998 to play for Club Atlético Independiente where he played until his retirement in 2000. 

Scoponi was the reserve goalkeeper for Argentina during their victorious Copa América 1993 campaign and in the 1994 FIFA World Cup.

Honours
Newell's Old Boys
Primera División Argentina: 1987–88, 1990–91, Clausura 1992
Copa Libertadores Runner-up: 1988, 1992

Argentina
Copa América: 1993

References

1961 births
Living people
Footballers from Rosario, Santa Fe
Argentine footballers
Argentine expatriate footballers
Association football goalkeepers
Argentine Primera División players
Liga MX players
Newell's Old Boys footballers
Cruz Azul footballers
Club Atlético Independiente footballers
1994 FIFA World Cup players
1993 Copa América players
Copa América-winning players
Expatriate footballers in Mexico